{{DISPLAYTITLE:C16H14O6}}
The molecular formula C16H14O6 may refer to:

 Blumeatin, a flavanone
 Dihydrokaempferide, a flavanonol
 Haematoxylin, a natural dye
 Hesperetin, a flavanone
 Homoeriodictyol, a flavanone
 Sterubin, a flavanone
 Thunberginol E, an isocoumarin